John H. McCall MacBain  (born in 1958) is a Swiss-based, Canadian billionaire businessman and philanthropist who is the founder of the McCall MacBain Foundation and Pamoja Capital SA, its investment arm. Prior to establishing the McCall MacBain Foundation, in the late 1980s he bought Auto Hebdo magazine in Montréal, Canada and bought and consolidated several other existing Auto Traders and Buy and Sell classified papers to form Trader Classified Media with operations in 23 countries.

Education and personal life
McCall MacBain received an MBA from Harvard Business School (1984), an MA in Law (Jurisprudence) from the University of Oxford (1982) as a Rhodes Scholar and an Honours BA in Economics from McGill University (1980). He holds honorary degrees from Dalhousie University, the University of Ottawa, Brock University, McGill University and Monash University.

He served as President of the Students' Society of McGill University, as well as valedictorian. While at Oxford, he was co-captain of the university's ice hockey team.

McCall MacBain has five children and two grandchildren. He is married to Marcy McCall MacBain, an academic at the University of Oxford in the Centre for Evidence-Based Medicine. He is also an avid skier, marathon runner, ice hockey player and cyclist as well as a commercial land and sea pilot.

Career
He worked from 1984 to 1987 as director of marketing at Power Financial Corporation.

From 1987 to 2006, McCall MacBain was the founder, President and CEO of Trader Classified Media, the world's leading classified advertising company. Starting with his purchase of three small publications in Montréal in 1987, when he was 29 years old, he developed the classified business to include 500 print titles and 57 internet sites in over 23 countries, including in Argentina, Australia, Canada, China, France, Hungary, Italy, Mexico, Spain and the United States.

After its IPO in 2000, Trader Classified Media was publicly traded on NASDAQ and the Euronext Paris Stock Exchange. In 2006, McCall MacBain sold the company and set up the McCall MacBain Foundation.

He is now Chancellor of McGill University for a three-year term from 2021 to 2024 and he is a member of The Giving Pledge.

Philanthropy
Since its formation in Geneva, Switzerland, in 2007, the McCall MacBain Foundation has made approximately $500 million of grants to fund projects relating to education and scholarships, health and climate change, and the environment. In addition to his role as a director and Chair of the foundation, McCall MacBain is the Founding Chair of the European Climate Foundation, Chancellor of McGill University, a member of the Advisory Board for the Yale Center for Environmental Law and Policy and a Foundation Fellow of Wadham College, Oxford. Additionally, he is a director of the Mandela Rhodes Foundation in Cape Town, South Africa.

McCall MacBain, a Canadian Rhodes Scholar (Quebec and Wadham, 1980), donated $120 million to the Rhodes Trust in order to help fund the scholarships and aid the expansion of the program to new countries. He made that gift in September 2013 during the Rhodes 110th anniversary celebrations. As a result, he was named a 'Second Century Founder of the Rhodes Scholarships' in honour of that significant gift. Additionally, McCall MacBain was honoured in 2014 as a Fellow of the Chancellor's Court of Benefactors at Oxford University and at Rhodes House, where his portrait hangs and a room bears his name. The McCall MacBain Graduate Centre at Wadham College, Oxford, was endowed by him.

McCall MacBain has also donated more than $10 million to fund McCall MacBain Loran Scholars through the Loran Scholars Foundation – the largest undergraduate entry scholarship program in Canada – and to fund the Mandela Rhodes Foundation.

On June 30, 2016, McCall MacBain was named an Officer of the Order of Canada by Governor General David Johnston for "his achievements as a business leader and for his contributions to academic institutions as a philanthropist."

On February 13, 2019, John and Marcy McCall MacBain donated $200 million to McGill University, the single-largest charitable gift in Canada at the time, for a graduate scholarship program – the McCall MacBain Scholarship at McGill – modelled on the Rhodes Scholarship.

In 2019, the McCall MacBain Foundation also seeded the Kupe Leadership Scholarship at the University of Auckland.

John and Marcy McCall MacBain joined The Giving Pledge in 2019. In their pledge letter they stated: “We believe that strong, dedicated and creative leadership is needed to address the world’s most pressing problems. We believe talent is found in every corner of the world, but that opportunities are not – and we want to reduce this gap .We pledge to give the majority of our wealth to philanthropic causes to provide greater benefit to our communities and our world by giving more, and by giving sooner.”

References

Officers of the Order of Canada
McGill University alumni
Harvard Business School alumni
Canadian Rhodes Scholars
Alumni of Wadham College, Oxford
Canadian chief executives
Year of birth missing (living people)
Living people
Rhodes Trustees
1950s births
Mazz
Mazz